Spring Brook may refer to

Spring Brook Township, Kittson County, Minnesota
Spring Brook (Susquehanna River tributary), a river in New York
Spring Brook (Beaver Kill), a river in New York
Spring Brook Township, Lackawanna County, Pennsylvania
Spring Brook, Wisconsin
Spring Brook (Lackawanna River)
Spring Brook (Santa Ana River), California
Spring Brook, a small river in southeast London, England; a tributary of the River Ravensbourne

See also
Springbrook (disambiguation)